Şükrü Gülesin (September 14, 1922 – July 10, 1977) was a Turkish football player and sports journalist. Almost two meters tall, he was a strong and quick striker, as well as a free kick and penalty specialist, and played for Beşiktaş, Palermo, and Lazio throughout his career. He scored a total of 226 goals in his entire career, of which 32 came directly by corner kicks (without an assist), more than any other footballer in history. He also played for Turkey at the 1948 Summer Olympics.

He died in 1977 of heart failure.

Individual
Beşiktaş J.K. Squads of Century (Golden Team)

References

External links
  Şükrü Gülesin’e Anma Töreni

1922 births
1977 deaths
Turkish footballers
Turkey international footballers
Turkish expatriate footballers
Beşiktaş J.K. footballers
Palermo F.C. players
S.S. Lazio players
Association football forwards
Serie A players
Expatriate footballers in Italy
Turkish expatriate sportspeople in Italy
Olympic footballers of Turkey
Footballers at the 1948 Summer Olympics